Zhejiang Wanma Co., Ltd. is a Chinese manufacturer of electricity transmission line. Wanma became a listed company since 2009. Zhejiang Wanma was a constituent of SZSE 100 Index, but was removed in January 2017. , it was a constituent of SZSE 200 Index (mid cap index). The firm manufactured electricity transmission line and distribution network. In 2017,it formed a joint venture in rental business of electricity-powered logistics vehicles. Zhang Desheng -- via his non wholly owned investment vehicle Zhejiang Wanma Group -- owned 35.4123% shares. He also owned 1.1276% directly; his daughter, 0.9166%. Wanma Technology started its own initial public offering in 2017. Immediately after the IPO, Zhang Desheng, owned 30.750% shares directly, as the largest shareholder of that company. Wanma Group was a sponsor of a Zhejiang basketball team.

References

External links
   

Former companies in the SZSE 100 Index
Manufacturing companies of China
Companies based in Hangzhou
Companies listed on the Shenzhen Stock Exchange
Civilian-run enterprises of China